Tse Tsan-tai (16 May 1872 – 4 April 1938), courtesy name Sing-on, art-named Hong-yu, was an Australian Chinese revolutionary, active during the late Qing dynasty. Tse had an interest in designing airships but none were ever constructed. His book The Chinese Republic: Secret History of the Revolution, published in 1924 by the South China Morning Post, of which he was co-founder, is an important source of studies on the anti-Qing revolution.

Early life

Born in Grafton, New South Wales, to Tse Yat-cheong who was a Chinese nationalist, Tse Tsan-tai was baptised "James See" on 1 November 1879. His family was on close terms with the family of Vivian Chow Yung, another prominent Chinese-Australian from Grafton. In 1887, Tse moved to Hong Kong with his family and he was educated at The Government Central School (now the Queen's College). Afterwards Tse worked as a secretary in the Public Works Department of the Government of Hong Kong for nearly 10 years.

Interest in airships

Tse claimed to have “invented” and designed the world's first steerable airship in 1894 which he named “CHINA”. After he had perfected his design, in 1899 he wrote to Hiram S. Maxim of the then recently merged Vickers & Maxim Company which had also started building airships. He provided drawings and explanations about how his design would enable airships to be steered by propellers and that the balloon, “cigar-shaped”, would be enclosed in an aluminum shell, thus “protecting it from enemy missiles”.

However, Maxim was obviously not overly impressed, replying politely to Tse that he was already in possession of Tse's “secrets”. The ‘secrets’ Maxim referred to were, coincidentally, revealed that same year with the launching in Germany of Count Zeppelin’s first giant rigid airship. Zeppelin had been way ahead of Tse, having first started planning these ships as early as 1874; he even patented the detailed design details in 1895 long before Tse had even started putting down on paper his “invention”.

As an anti-Qing dynasty revolutionary

On 13 March 1892, Tse, together with Yeung Ku-wan and others, started the Furen Literary Society in Pak Tse Lane, Sheung Wan, with the guiding principle of "Ducit Amor Patriae" ( in Chinese, literally "Love your country with all your heart"). The Furen Literary Society was merged into the Hong Kong Chapter of the Revive China Society in 1895, with Yeung and Sun Yat-sen as the president and secretary of the society respectively. When Yeung and Sun fled overseas after the unsuccessful First Guangzhou Uprising, Tse remained in Hong Kong.

After Yeung was assassinated by Qing agents in 1901, Tse strove for his burial in the Hong Kong Cemetery, albeit with a nameless gravestone. Determined to avenge his friend, Tse, together with his father, his brother, Hung Chuen-fook and triads, plotted another uprising in Canton. They called for the establishment of the State of Great Ming Heavenly Kingdom, a democratic state with an elected sage and talent as the president, and persuaded Yung Wing to serve as the provisional president of the state. According to the plan, with financial sponsorship from Li Ki-tong, they would destroy the Emperor's Temple with explosives on 28 January 1903, killing all the officials there, and then occupy the city of Canton. The plot was leaked to the Qing government by a betraying informant.

As a newspaper person, Tse wrote the first declaration of the Revive China Society, with an open letter to the Guangxu Emperor in English. He also published The Situation in the Far East to warn patriots against the Western powers' ambition to partition China. In November 1903, Tse co-founded the South China Morning Post with Alfred Cunningham.

Tse was also a Christian, and published a book entitled The Creation, the Garden of Eden and the Origin of the Chinese in 1914. In it, he argued that the Garden of Eden was located in modern-day Xinjiang and that many Biblical events and narratives occurred within China's vicinity.

After the revolution
After the Xinhai Revolution in 1911, Tse was not involved in the Republic of China Government. He died on 4 April 1938 and was buried in Hong Kong.

References 

Chinese revolutionaries
Hong Kong newspaper people
Australian people of Chinese descent
1872 births
1938 deaths
People from Sydney
Australian emigrants to Hong Kong
Chinese Christians
Alumni of Queen's College, Hong Kong
Christian creationists